Mitchell Cove is the 2.8 km wide bay indenting for 3 km the southwest coast of Robert Island in the South Shetland Islands, Antarctica southeast of Alfatar Peninsula, and entered between Debelyanov Point and Negra Point.  The area was visited by early 19th century sealers.

The feature is named after James Mitchell, co-owner of the British cutter Beaufoy under Captain James Weddell that visited the South Shetlands in 1823–24.

Location

See also
 Robert Island
 South Shetland Islands

Map
 L.L. Ivanov. Antarctica: Livingston Island and Greenwich, Robert, Snow and Smith Islands. Scale 1:120000 topographic map.  Troyan: Manfred Wörner Foundation, 2009.

References
 SCAR Composite Antarctic Gazetteer.

Coves of Robert Island